Kevin Coyle (born January 14, 1956) is an American football coach who is currently the defensive coordinator at Fresno State. Prior to that, Coyle was a senior analyst at LSU. He served as head coach of the Atlanta Legends of the Alliance of American Football (AAF) and also spent 13 seasons with the Cincinnati Bengals of the National Football League (NFL).

In October 2018, Coyle agreed to become the defensive coordinator of the Atlanta Legends of the Alliance of American Football, taking over the position upon completing the 2018 college football season with LSU. On January 9, 2019, Coyle was promoted to head coach after Brad Childress resigned from the position.

Raised in New Dorp, in 1974 Coyle graduated from Monsignor Farrell High School in Oakwood, Staten Island, New York.  He was inducted into the Staten Island Sports Hall of Fame in 2011.

Head coaching record

Alliance of American Football

See also

References

External links
 Cincinnati Bengals bio
 Fresno State Bulldogs bio

1956 births
Living people
Arkansas Razorbacks football coaches
Atlanta Legends coaches
Cincinnati Bearcats football coaches
Cincinnati Bengals coaches
Fresno State Bulldogs football coaches
Holy Cross Crusaders football coaches
LSU Tigers football coaches
Maryland Terrapins football coaches
Merchant Marine Mariners football coaches
Miami Dolphins coaches
National Football League defensive coordinators
Syracuse Orange football coaches
UMass Minutemen football players
Sportspeople from Staten Island
Monsignor Farrell High School alumni
People from New Dorp, Staten Island